Suki Seokyeong Kang (강서경) is a visual artist based in Seoul, Korea. Kang's practice traverses painting, sculpture, performance, video and installation. Inspired by cultural traditions of Korea as well as contemporary artistic and literary discourses.  Kang decodes rules and values that govern these disciplines, turning to artistic languages of the past to construct a contextual lens through which she explores the notion of individuality and freedom in the present moment.

Life 
Kang was born in Seoul, South Korea. She studied Oriental painting at Ewha Womans University and painting at the Royal College of Art, London. She is a professor of Korean painting at Ewha Womans University.

Work and themes 
Kang's practice draws on her early training in traditional Korean painting. In her works, she espouses the philosophical disposition of Chosun-era painters, who aimed to convey their own observations and interpretations of history through poetry, writing, and visual art.

Kang's multimedia work often takes the form of immersive installations. Her 2017 project Black Mat Oriole incorporates sculpture, painting, and video. The colors of the objects in the installation are based on colors from her paintings. The work also included performers who carry and arrange objects, and sit and drag their bodies on the floor.

Kang's installations all include objects that are liftable by the artist and any performers, and have sizes and weights that are at most as large as a standard human body. This technique has been a catalyst to convey themes relating to the subjects of her work. For example, the shape of the sculpture Grandmother Tower was inspired by the posture of her grandmother. She has also incorporated traditional hand-woven reed mats that she had commissioned.

Among the themes of Kang's work are the coming together of individuals, and how they both form community and experience their own histories. She is also inspired by classical Korean poetry and dance. Her installation work explores concepts relating to grids and their aesthetics, and how objects are arranged within a room. Her style has influence from Jeongganbo, a form of Korean musical notation.

Kang has a studio in Seochon. She paints a gouache painting every day as part of her work.

Exhibition History 
Selected solo and group exhibitions of Suki Seokyeong Kang include the 58th Venice Biennale (2019); MUDAM Luxembourg (2019); Seoul Museum of Art (2019); Liverpool Biennial (2018); 12th Shanghai Biennale (2018); San José Museum of Art (2018); Institute of Contemporary Art, Philadelphia (2018); MAK Center for Art and Architecture, Los Angeles (2018); Gwangju Biennale (2018, 2016); Museum of Modern and Contemporary Art, Seoul (2017); Villa Vassilieff, Paris (2016); National Museum of Modern and Contemporary Art, Gwacheon (2016); Audio Visual Pavilion, Seoul (2015); Seoul Museum of Art (2014); Gallery Factory, Seoul (2013); Old House, Seoul (2013); and Bloomberg New Contemporaries, London (2012). She is the recipient of the Baloise Art Prize (2018) and Songeun Art Award (2013).

In March 2022, Kang will have two solo exhibitions at the Leeum, Samsung Museum of Art.

Awards 
Kang was a recipient of a 2018 Baloise Art Prize. She was also shortlisted for the SongEun Art Award in 2013–2014.

Collections 
The work of Suki Seokyeong Kang is included in the permanent collections of Los Angeles County Museum of Art, Los Angeles; MMCA (National Museum of Modern and Contemporary Art), Seoul; Walker Art Center, Minneapolis; Leeum Samsung Museum of Art, Seoul; Princeton University Art Museum, Princeton; MUDAM Luxembourg; Seoul Museum of Art, Seoul; Arario Museum, Seoul; Booth Collection-University of Chicago, Chicago; National Art Bank, Korea, among others.

Publications

References

External links 
 

1977 births
Artists from Seoul
Multimedia artists
Living people
South Korean women artists
21st-century South Korean artists